George Kelly (15 June 1908 – 27 November 1988) was an Irish boxer. He competed in the men's featherweight event at the 1928 Summer Olympics. At the 1928 Summer Olympics, he lost to Ricardt Madsen of Denmark.

References

External links
 

1908 births
1988 deaths
Irish male boxers
Olympic boxers of Ireland
Boxers at the 1928 Summer Olympics
Place of birth missing
Featherweight boxers